Mário Alberto Nobre Lopes Soares,  (7 December 1924 – 7 January 2017) was a Portuguese politician, who served as prime minister of Portugal from 1976 to 1978 and from 1983 to 1985, and subsequently as the 17th president of Portugal from 1986 to 1996. He was the first secretary-general of the Socialist Party, from its foundation in 1973 to 1986. A major political figure in Portugal, he is considered the father of Portuguese democracy.

Family
Soares was the son of João Lopes Soares (Leiria, Arrabal, 17 November 1879 – Lisbon, Campo Grande, 31 July 1970), founder of the Colégio Moderno in Lisbon, government minister and then anti-fascist republican activist who had been a priest before impregnating and marrying Elisa Nobre Baptista (Santarém, Pernes, 8 September 1887 – Lisbon, Campo Grande, 28 February 1955), Mário Soares's mother, at the 7th Conservatory of the Civil Register of Lisbon on 5 September 1934. His father also had another son by an unknown mother named Tertuliano Lopes Soares. His mother had previously been married and had two children, J. Nobre Baptista and Cândido Nobre Baptista. Mário Soares was raised as a Roman Catholic, but came to identify himself as a republican, secular and socialist.

Early life
Soares was born in the Coração de Jesus neighbourhood of Lisbon, and graduated in history and philosophy from the University of Lisbon. He became a university lecturer in 1957, but his activities in opposition to the dictatorship of António de Oliveira Salazar led to repeated arrests. He was active in resistance groups such as the Movement for Anti-Fascist National Unity and the Movement for Democratic Unity.

Soares began his studies at Colégio Moderno, owned by his father. There, for a short period he was taught geography by Álvaro Cunhal, who would later become the towering figure of Portuguese Communism and one of Soares' greatest political rivals.

While a student at university, Soares joined the Portuguese Communist Party, being responsible for the youth section. In this capacity, he organised demonstrations in Lisbon to celebrate the end of World War II. Soares was arrested twice in 1949. On those latter occasions, he was the secretary of General Norton de Matos, a candidate for the Presidency. However, he became estranged from de Matos when the latter discovered Soares's Communist sympathies.  

Soares married Maria de Jesus Barroso Soares, an actress, on 22 February 1949, while in the Aljube prison, at the Third Conservatory of the Civil Register of Lisbon. They had a son, João Soares, who later became Mayor of Lisbon, and a daughter, Isabel Barroso Soares (born in 1951), who now manages the Colégio Moderno.

Soares's multiple arrests for political activism made it impossible for him to continue with his career as a lecturer of history and philosophy. Therefore, he decided to study law and become an attorney.

Political activity during the Estado Novo
In 1958, Soares was very active in the presidential election supporting General Humberto Delgado. Later, he would become Delgado's family lawyer, when Humberto Delgado was murdered in 1965, in Spain, by agents of the dictatorship's secret police (PIDE). As a lawyer, he defended some of Portuguese political prisoners and participated in numerous trials conducted in the Plenary Court and in the Special Military Court. Represented, particularly, Álvaro Cunhal when he was accused of several political crimes, and along with Adelino da Palma Carlos he also defended the dynastic cause of Maria Pia of Saxe-Coburg and Gotha Braganza.

In April 1964, in Geneva, Switzerland, Soares together with Francisco Ramos da Costa and Manuel Tito de Morais created the Acção Socialista Portuguesa (Portuguese Socialist Action). At this point he was already quite distant from his former Communist friends (having quit the Communist Party in 1951); his views were now clearly inclined towards economic liberalism.

In March 1968, Soares was arrested again by PIDE, and a military tribunal sentenced him to banishment in the colony of São Tomé and Principe in the Gulf of Guinea.  His wife and two children, Isabel and João, accompanied him. However, they returned to Lisbon eight months later for in the meantime dictator Salazar had been replaced by Marcello Caetano. The new dictator wanted to present a more democratic face to the world, so many political prisoners, Soares among them, were released and allowed exile in France.

In the October 1969 general election, which was rigged, the democratic opposition (whose political rights were severely restricted) entered with two different lists. Soares participated actively in the campaign supporting the Coligação Eleitoral de Unidade Democrática or CEUD (Electoral Coalition for Democratic Unity). CEUD was clearly anti-fascist, but they also reaffirmed their opposition to Communism.

In 1970, Soares was exiled to Rome, Italy, but eventually settled in France where he taught at the Universities of Vincennes, Paris and Rennes. In 1973, the 'Portuguese Socialist Action' became the Socialist Party, and Soares was elected Secretary-General. The Socialist party was created under the umbrella of Willy Brandt's SPD in Bad Münstereifel, Germany, on 19 April 1973.

Carnation Revolution
On 25 April 1974, elements of the Portuguese Army seized power in Lisbon, overthrowing Salazar's successor, Marcello Caetano. Soares and other political exiles returned home to celebrate what was termed the "Carnation Revolution".

In the provisional government which was formed after the revolution, led by the Movement of the Armed Forces (MFA), Soares became minister for overseas negotiations, charged with organising the independence of Portugal's overseas colonies. Among other encounters, he met with Samora Machel, the leader of Frelimo, to negotiate the independence of Mozambique.

Within months of the revolution however (and in spite of the April 1975 Constituent Assembly election results which gave victory to the Socialist Party and clearly favored the pro-democracy political parties), it became apparent that the Portuguese Communist Party, allied with a radical group of officers in the MFA, was attempting to extend its control over the government. The prime minister, Vasco dos Santos Gonçalves, was accused of being an agent of the Communists and a bitter confrontation developed between the Socialists and Communists over control of the newspaper República.

President Francisco da Costa Gomes dismissed Vasco Gonçalves in September 1975 and a failed far-left coup in late November ended the far-left influence in Portuguese government and politics. After the approval of the 1976 Constitution, a democratic government was finally established when national elections were held on 25 April 1976.

Prime minister
The 1976 legislative election gave the Socialists a plurality of seats in the newly created Assembly of the Republic and Soares became prime minister. Deep hostility between the Socialists and the Communists made a left-wing majority government impossible, and Soares formed a weak minority government. Vast fiscal and currency account deficits generated by previous governments forced Soares to adopt a strict austerity policy, which made him deeply unpopular. Soares had to resign from office after only two years, in 1978.

The wave of left-wing sentiment which followed the 1974 revolution had now dissipated, and a succession of conservative governments held office until 1983, with Soares' Socialist Party unsuccessful in the 1979 special elections and 1980 elections. Soares again became prime minister following the 1983 elections, holding office until late 1985. His main achievement in office was negotiating Portugal's entry into the European Economic Community. Portugal at the time was very wary of integrating itself into the EEC, and Soares almost single-handedly turned public opinion around.

Presidency

In the 1986 presidential election, Soares was elected president of Portugal, beating Diogo Freitas do Amaral by little more than 2%. He was reelected in 1991, this time with almost 70% of the vote. For most of Soares' two terms of office, Portugal was governed by the centre-right Social Democratic Party, led by Aníbal Cavaco Silva.

In 1989, he was the first foreign head of state to visit Czechoslovakia in the course of the Velvet Revolution, invited by Václav Havel, who was elected president of Czechoslovakia two days later.

He devised the so-called Presidência Aberta (Open Presidency), a series of tours around the country, each addressing a particular issue, such as the environment or a particular region of Portugal. Although generally well received by the public, some claimed that he was criticizing the government and exceeding his constitutional role. Others stated that the tours were in the style of medieval courts. Yet the name stuck for today's presidential initiatives of the same type.

Post-Presidency
Soares retired in 1996, but in 1998 he headed the Independent World Commission on the Oceans.
In 1999 he headed the Socialist ticket in elections to the European Parliament, where he served until the 2004 elections. He ran for President of the Parliament, but lost to Nicole Fontaine.
In 2000 he was awarded the North-South Prize.
Soares was a member of the Club de Madrid, an independent organization of more than 80 former democratic statesmen from around the world. The group works to strengthen democratic governance and leadership.
In March 2005, he launched a petition urging the European Union to start membership talks with Cape Verde.
On 30 August 2005, he announced his candidacy to run for president in the election that occurred on 22 January 2006, when he was 81 years old. However, he lost the election to Aníbal Cavaco Silva and was even behind Manuel Alegre, receiving 14% of the vote. "The results went against my expectations. I accept this defeat with a feeling of mission accomplished," he said. It was suggested (on the RTP1 TV programme Prós e Contras in March 2008) that one of the reasons for his weak support could be that the Portuguese were reluctant to elect any president for more than two terms (only allowed by the Portuguese Constitution of 1976 if non-consecutive).

 In the TV programme Os Grandes Portugueses (English: The Greatest Portuguese), he was voted 12th, the highest-placed among living people chosen by the public. 
 He was a member of the strongest Masonic lodge in Portugal.
 He was president of the then  ( (FMS)).
 He was a Member of the Portuguese Council of State, as a former elected president of Portugal.
After the Finnish general elections on 17 April 2011, Soares opined that "Finland has changed into an extremely conservative country, where solidarity is unknown." Soares evoked the memory of Kalevi Sorsa, contrasting his generosity with "those dwarfs, who now want to rule Finland, their ethical values and hostility to Portugal". According to Soares the Finns live in an illusion, believing that "speculative markets and credit criminals can destroy nations with nine hundred years' independent history".

Death and state funeral

Soares died on 7 January 2017 at the age of 92. He had been admitted to the hospital on 13 December, and although his condition at first showed slight signs of improvement, he lapsed into a coma on 26 December from which he never recovered. The Portuguese Government offered a state funeral and declared three days of national mourning. It was the first state funeral in Portugal after that of President Óscar Carmona in 1951. After lying in state at Jerónimos Monastery during 9 January, his remains were transported to Prazeres Cemetery the next day, and now lie at the family vault next to those of his wife.

Honours and awards

National honours 
N.B. according to "Ordens honoríficas portuguesas – Nacionais com Ordens Portuguesas"  recipients:
  Grand Collar of the Order of the Tower and Sword (GColTE – 9 March 1991)
  Grand Cross of the Order of Christ (GCC – 09/04/1981)
  Grand Collar of the Order of Liberty (GColL – 9 March 1996)
  Grand Master of the Portuguese Orders (9 March 1986 – 9 March 1996):

Foreign honours 
N.B. according to "Ordens honoríficas portuguesas – Nacionais com Ordens Estrangeiras" recipients:
  Grand Cross of the Order of Merit of the Austrian Republic (Austria, 1987/03/10)
  Grand Cross of the National Order of Merit (pt – B1) (Brazil, 1988/03/30)
  Grand Cross of the Order of the Southern Cross (Brazil, 1987/03/10)
  Grand Collar of the Order of the Southern Cross (Brazil, 1987/11/10)
  Grand Collar of the Order of the National Congress (pt) (Brazil, 1987/04/13)
  Grand Cross of the Ordef of Ipiranga (pt) (State of São Paulo, 1987/04/13)
  Collar of the Order of Merit of Bahia (State of Bahia, 1988/03/30)
  Order of the Balkan Mountains with Ribbon (Bulgaria, 1994/10/26)
  1st Class of the Order of Amílcar Cabral (Cape Verde, 2001/01/05)
  Collar of the Grand Cross of the Order of Merit (Chile, 1992/07/22)
  Grand Collar of the Order of Boyaca (Colombia, 1988/05/27)
  Grand Cross of the Order of Merit (Congo, 1989/09/12)
  1st Class of the Order of Diplomatic Service Merit (South Korea, 1987/04/23)
  Grand Collar of the Order of Makarios III (Cyprus, 1990/05/29)
  Grand Cross of the Order of the Dannebrog (Denmark, 1988/03/30)
  Knight of the Order of the Elephant (Denmark, 1992/05/06)
  Grand Cross of the Order of Merit of Duarte, Sánchez and Mella (Dominican Republic, 1987/03/10)
  Collar of the National Order of Merit (Ecuador, 1989/09/12)
  Collar of the Order of the Nile (Egypt, 1992/04/04)
  Grand Cross of the Order of the White Rose of Finland with Collar (Finland,1990)
  Grand Cross of the National Order of Merit	(France, 1988/05/26)
  Grand Cross of the Legion of Honour (France, 1990/05/07)
  Grand Cross of the Order of Merit of the Federal Republic of Germany (Germany, 1987/03/10)
  Grand Cross Special Class of the Order of Merit of the Federal Republic of Germany (Germany, 1991/01/08)
  Grand Cross of the Order of the Redeemer (Greece, 1987/11/20)
  Collar of the Order of Pope Pius IX (Holy See, 1991/01/08)
  Grand Cross of the Order of Merit of the Republic of Hungary	(Hungary, 1993/01/25)
  Grand Cross of the Order of the Falcon (Iceland, 1983/11/21)
  Grand Collar with Collar of the Order of the Falcon (Iceland, 1993/06/04)
  Grand Cross of the Order of Merit of the Italian Republic (Italy, 1984/04/26)
  Grand Cross with Collar of the Order of Merit of the Italian Republic (Italy, 1989/04/05)
  Grand Cross of the National Order of the Ivory Coast (Ivory Coast, 1990/06/01)
  Knight of the Order of the Gold Lion of the House of Nassau (Luxembourg, 1988/05/26)
  Honorary Companion of Honour of the National Order of Merit (Malta, 1994/10/09)
  Collar of the Order pro merito Melitensi (Sovereign Military Order of Malta, 1989/05/09)
 Special Class of the Order of Sovereignty (Morocco, 1992/02/06)
  Knight Grand Cross of the Order of the Netherlands Lion (Netherlands, 1991/09/26)
  Grand Cross of the Order of St. Olav (Norway, 1987/03/10)
  1st Class of the Star of Palestine (Palestine, 1993/11/18)
  Grand Cross of the Order of Merit of the Republic of Poland (Poland, 1993/05/21)
  Grand Cross of the Order of Polonia Restituta (Poland, 1994/10/26)
  Grand Cross of the Order of Merit (Senegal, 1996/02/28)
  Grand Cross of the Order of Good Hope (South Africa, 1995)
  Grand Cross of the Order of Isabella the Catholic (Spain, 1977/11/21)
  Grand Cross of the Order of Charles III (Spain, 1987/03/10)
  Collar of the Order of Charles III (Spain, 1988/03/30)
  Knight of the Order of the Seraphim (Sweden, 1987/01/28)
  Grand Cross of the Order of the Seventh of November (Tunisia, 1993/02/16)
  Honorary Knight Grand Cross (with Collar) of the Order of the Bath (United Kingdom, 1994/05/19)
 Honorary Knight Grand Cross of the Order of St Michael and St George (United Kingdom, 1996)
  Grand Collar of the Order of the Liberator (Venezuela, 1987/11/10)
  Order of the Yugoslav Star with Sash (Yugoslavia, 1988/03/30)
  Great Star of the Order of the Yugoslav Star (Yugoslavia, 1990/04/24)
  Grand Cordon of the National Order of the Leopard (Zaire, 1989/12/04)

Foreign awards 
In 1998, Soares won the International Simón Bolívar Prize of UNESCO.

In 2000, Soares received the North-South Prize of the Council of Europe.

He was an honorary member of the Club of Rome and member of High Council of Francophonie.

He was appointed Doctor of Laws (honoris causa) by the University of Leicester in 1994.

Soares was named the "patron" for the College of Europe's academic year 2020-2021.

Electoral results

1986 Portuguese presidential election

Mário Soares won the election with 3,010,756 votes (51.18%) after the second round of voting.

1991 Portuguese presidential election

Mário Soares won the election with 3,459,521 votes (70.35%).

2006 Portuguese presidential election

Mário Soares finished third with 785,355 votes (14.31%).

Notes

References

Further reading
 Wilsford, David, ed. Political Leaders of Contemporary Western Europe: A Biographical Dictionary (Greenwood, 1995) pp. 413–21.

External links

 Fundação Mário Soares

1924 births
2017 deaths
Presidents of Portugal
Prime Ministers of Portugal
Portuguese democracy activists
Portuguese anti-fascists
People from Lisbon
Former Roman Catholics
Portuguese agnostics
Golden Globes (Portugal) winners
Portuguese Freemasons
Portuguese Communist Party politicians
Socialist Party (Portugal) politicians
Socialist Party (Portugal) MEPs
MEPs for Portugal 1999–2004
Foreign ministers of Portugal
University of Lisbon alumni
Academic staff of Rennes 2 University
20th-century Portuguese lawyers

Grand Collars of the Order of Liberty
Grand Crosses of the Order of Christ (Portugal)
Recipients of the Order of the Tower and Sword

Grand Crosses of the Order of Polonia Restituta
Grand Crosses of the Order of Merit of the Republic of Poland
Grand Crosses Special Class of the Order of Merit of the Federal Republic of Germany
Recipients of the National Order of Merit (Brazil)
Recipients of the Order pro Merito Melitensi
International Simón Bolívar Prize recipients
Member of the Academy of the Kingdom of Morocco